Tor Poznań is a  motorsport race track located in the Ławica area of Poznań, Poland. The circuit has also small  kart circuit layout. The circuit was resurphaced and renovated in 2006, and it has FIA Grade 3 standards.

Lap records 

Marc Gené held the unofficial lap record with a lap of 1:14.700 with Ferrari 248 F1 in a demonstration event in 2007. The official race lap records at the Tor Poznań are listed as:

References

External links
Circuit website

Sport in Poznań
Buildings and structures in Poznań
Motorsport venues in Poland